Procellosaurinus erythrocercus, Rodrigues's red teiid, is a species of lizard in the family Gymnophthalmidae. It is endemic to Brazil.

References

Procellosaurinus
Reptiles of Brazil
Endemic fauna of Brazil
Reptiles described in 1991
Taxa named by Miguel Trefaut Rodrigues